Henry Dunay is an American goldsmith and jewelry designer, best known for his fine scratched surface technique known as Sabi.

Biography
Born Henry Loniewski in Jersey City, New Jersey on May 1, 1935, he was the second of three sons of Polish Americans Henry and Helen Loniewski. At the age of 18, feeling that the name Loniewski would be an impediment, he changed it to Dunay, his mother’s short and memorable maiden name.

History 

Having apprenticed in the workshop of New York City jeweler Rudolph Cacioli at the age of 14, Dunay learned the fine art of creating jewelry.  Though starting as an errand boy, he quickly worked his way up to becoming a master model maker and setter at a remarkably young age, impressing Cacioli with the fineness of his work and the refinement of his proportions and curves.  Observing that most jewelry in shop windows he peered into followed the same styles and dimensions, he started his own firm in 1956. Taking on work from other manufacturers (including Harry Winston) to support himself initially, Dunay quickly found success and fame after winning the De Beers Diamond International Award, which showered images of his designs around the world.

Soon, Henry Dunay jewelry could be found in some of the most important jewelry stores where shoppers were drawn to the unique style, sensuous curves, and exceptional craftsmanship of the jewelry designed and created by Henry Dunay.  A key supporter was Stanley Marcus, whose Neiman Marcus department stores first sold branded designer jewelry when they began selling Henry Dunay.  Jewelry was soon followed by timepieces, fragrances, and objet d'art.

Henry Dunay achieved notable success after the introduction of the Sabi finish.  Inspired by the Japanese wabi-sabi aesthetic, which embraces asymmetry, simplicity, and the integrity of natural processes and objects.  Described initially as "simple elegance," Sabi consisted of finely hand-etched lines that require remarkable precision and skill by Henry Dunay to create the sophisticated look.  Coinciding with the brand's rising popularity in Japan and the growing influence of Far Eastern cultures on its designs, Sabi solidified once again Henry Dunay's position as a leading jewelry designer, artist and trendsetter in the world of fine jewelry.

Dunay designed a ring from an uncut Arkansas diamond for Hilary Clinton to wear to the 1993 inaugural balls. 

Affected by the late-2000s financial crisis, Henry Dunay Designs and its inventory valued at $50 million was sold at auction in December 2009. He later formed a new company, H.D.D. Inc., focusing on custom pieces.

Today he continues to design and hand fabricate jewelry in New York City's Diamond District.

Awards
Henry Dunay has been awarded over 50 National and International Awards over fifty years.
Dunay is the four time winner of the Diamond International award.

2001 Best in Design: Pearls Couture Jewelry Collection & Conference
2000 Robb Report Magazine June 12 Annual Best of the Best Jewelry Designer in the World
1999 Robb Report Magazine June 11 Annual Best of the Best Jewelry Designer in the World
1999 Robb Report Magazine Best American Jewelry Designer
1996 Contemporary Design Group Hall of Fame
1995 Watch and Clock Review First Prize
1995 Watch and Clock Review Citation for Excellence
1994 Diamonds International Award
1993 Lifetime Achievement Award- Modern Jewelry Magazine
1993 Diamond Today Award
1988 Spectrum Award- Gemstone Jewelry Design Competition awarded by the American Gem Trade Administration
1987 DeBeer's Men's Collection Award
1985 Platinum Award Japan
1985 Diamonds Today Award
1984 Spectrum Award- Gemstone Jewelry Design Competition awarded by the American Gem Trade Administration
1983 Johnston Matthey Platinum Design Award
1983 Award for Outstanding Achievement in Cultural Pearl Jewelry Design
1982 Johnston Matthey Platinum Design Award
1982 Diamonds International 3X Winner
1981 Cultured Pearl Association of Japan's Judge's Prize
1977 Diamonds Today Award
1975 Diamonds Today Award
1975 American Manufacturing Jewelers & Silversmiths Award
1970 Diamonds for Christmas Award
1969 Prix de Ville de Geneve de la Bijoutiere, del Joaiolerie, de l'Horlojerie et de l'Emaillllerie
1967 Diamonds International Award

References

1935 births
American jewellers
Living people
Artists from Jersey City, New Jersey
Businesspeople from New York City